George Griffiths (23 June 1924 – 8 January 2004) was an English professional football right back who made over 400 appearances in the Football League for Bury and Halifax Town.

References 

English footballers
English Football League players
Association football fullbacks
1924 births
2004 deaths
People from Newton-le-Willows
Earlestown F.C. players
Bury F.C. players
Halifax Town A.F.C. players
English football managers